Gottlob Christian Storr (10 September 1746 – 17 January 1805) was a German Protestant theologian, born in Stuttgart. He was the son of theologian Johann Christian Storr (1712–1773) and the older brother of naturalist Gottlieb Conrad Christian Storr (1749–1821).

Biography
Storr studied philosophy and theology at the University of Tübingen, where his instructors were Jeremias Friedrich Reuß (1700–1777) and Johann Friedrich Cotta (1701–1779). Following completion of his theological examination in 1768, he undertook an educational journey with his brother through Germany, Holland, England and France. In 1775 he became a vicar in Stuttgart, and two years later returned to Tübingen as an associate professor of philosophy and theology. In 1786 he attained a full professorship at Tübingen, and in 1797 returned to Stuttgart as an Oberhofprediger.

He was an outspoken advocate of Biblical supranaturalism, and founder of Ältere Tübinger Schule (conservative Tübingen school of theologians). His conservative orthodox views in theology placed him at odds with proponents of the Enlightenment, rationalism and Kantian philosophy. Two of Storr's better known followers were Friedrich Gottlieb Süskind (1767–1829) and Johann Friedrich Flatt (1759–1821).

Another of Storr's famous students was G.W.F. Hegel (1770-1831).

He was the first to propose that the New Testament book of Mark was written prior to the other Gospels (Markan priority), an assertion that opposed the traditional view that the book of Matthew was the earliest Gospel written.

He died in Stuttgart.

Selected publications
 "Observationes super Novi Testamenti versionibus syriacis", 1772.
 "Dissertatio de evangeliis arabicis", 1775.
 Neue Apologie der Offenbarung Johannis, 1783.
 
 Über den Zweck der evangelischen Geschichte und der Briefe Johannis, 1786, second edition 1810.
 "Doctrinae christianae pars theoretica", 1793 (translated into German by Johann Friedrich Flatt in 1813).
 "Opuscula academica ad interpretationem librorum sacrorum pertinentia" (1796–97), 2 volumes.

References

Further reading 
(en) Werner Raupp: Storr, Gottlob Christian, in: Heiner F. Klemme/Manfred Kuehn (Ed.), The Dictionary of Eighteenth-Century German Philosophers, Vol. 3, London/New York 2010, p. 1138–1140. 
(de) Werner Raupp: Storr, Gottlob Christian, in: Neue Deutsche Biographie (NDB), Vol. 25 (2013), p. 447–449.

1746 births
1805 deaths
Writers from Stuttgart
18th-century German Protestant theologians
Academic staff of the University of Tübingen
German male non-fiction writers
18th-century German male writers